Hanna Gunnarsson (born 1983) is a Swedish politician. Since September 2018, she serves as Member of the Riksdag. She was again elected as Member of the Riksdag in September 2022. She represents the constituency of Skåne Southern. She is affiliated with the Left Party.

References 

Living people
1983 births
Place of birth missing (living people)
21st-century Swedish politicians
21st-century Swedish women politicians
Members of the Riksdag 2018–2022
Members of the Riksdag 2022–2026
Members of the Riksdag from the Left Party (Sweden)
Women members of the Riksdag